George Quincy (born in Oklahoma, United States) is an American composer and conductor of Choctaw heritage. He has composed for theater, dance, music, and television.

Quincy holds degrees from the Juilliard School, where he has also taught. He worked with the Martha Graham Dance Company.

Quincy has performed at the National Museum of the American Indian. His music has been performed by Timothy Archambault. A CD of Quincy's music, entitled Choctaw Nights, was released by Albany Records.  Another was released by Lyrichord Classical.

He is an advisor to the First Nations Composer Initiative.

He lives in New York City.

External links
George Quincy official site
"American Indian Composers Go Classical", by Felix Contreras, from All Things Considered, January 1, 2009

Listening
Audio samples
Audio samples

Sources

Living people
Juilliard School alumni
Native American composers
Musicians from Oklahoma
American male classical composers
American classical composers
20th-century classical composers
21st-century classical composers
21st-century American composers
American people of Choctaw descent
20th-century American composers
20th-century American male musicians
21st-century American male musicians
Year of birth missing (living people)